The Namibia national rugby sevens team has played in various rugby sevens tournaments, including the Commonwealth Games and the World Rugby Sevens Series. Namibia did not qualify for the Tokyo Olympics after finishing 5th at the 2019 Africa Men's Sevens.

Players
12 men squad to the South African leg of the 2010–11 IRB Sevens World Series
Yoshiro Klazen
John Drotsky
Huscit Visagie
Howard Titus
Justin Nel
Attie du Plessis
Stein Gregory
Melrick Africa
Deon Mouton
Desmond Snyders
Loe Riekerts
Anthony Brandt
Simon Roberts

Tournament History

Rugby World Cup Sevens

Commonwealth Games

2006 Commonwealth Games
Group A matches
 Kenya 31–5 Namibia
 New Zealand 41–7 Namibia
 Wales 40–7 Namibia
Bowl-quarter-finals
 Scotland 26–12 Namibia

See also
 Namibia national rugby union team (XV)
 Rugby union in Namibia

References

National rugby sevens teams
sevens